Shoeyteh (also Romanized as Sho‘eyţeh, Sha‘eyţeh, and Sha‘īţeh) is a village in Azadeh Rural District, Moshrageh District, Ramshir County, Khuzestan Province, Iran. At the 2006 census, its population was 41, in 7 families.

References 

Populated places in Ramshir County